The 2015 World Junior Ice Hockey Championships was the 39th edition of Ice Hockey World Junior Championship, played from December 26, 2014 to January 5, 2015. It was co-hosted by Toronto, Ontario, and Montreal, Quebec, Canada, and organized by Hockey Canada, Hockey Quebec, the Ontario Hockey Federation, the Montreal Canadiens, Maple Leafs Sports and Entertainment and Evenko. Games were split between Air Canada Centre in Toronto and Bell Centre in Montreal, with Montreal hosting Group A matches and two quarter finals, and Toronto hosting Group B, along with the relegation games, two quarter finals, along with the semi-finals, bronze medal, and gold medal games.

After failing to medal at the previous two editions of the tournament, Canada beat Russia in the final to win the gold medal, marking Canada's first medal at the World Juniors since 2012, and Canada's first gold since 2009. Slovakia defeated Sweden in the bronze medal game to win their second-ever medal. Germany finished tenth overall and was relegated to Division I-A for the 2016 tournament. Slovak goaltender Denis Godla was named the tournament's most valuable player, while Sam Reinhart of Canada was the scoring leader with 11 points.

Player eligibility 
A player is eligible to play in the 2015 World Junior Ice Hockey Championships if:
 the player is of male gender;
 the player was born at the earliest in 1995, and at the latest, in 2000;
 the player is a citizen in the country he represents;
 the player is under the jurisdiction of a national association that is a member of the IIHF.

If a player who has never played in IIHF-organized competition wishes to switch national eligibility, he must have played in competitions for two consecutive years in the new country without playing in another country, as well as show his move to the new country's national association with an international transfer card. In case the player has previously played in IIHF-organized competition but wishes to switch national eligibility, he must have played in competitions for four consecutive years in the new country without playing in another country, he must show his move to the new country's national association with an international transfer card, as well as be a citizen of the new country. A player may only switch national eligibility once.

Top Division

Venues

Officials
The IIHF selected 12 referees and 10 linesmen to officiate during the tournament:

Referees
  Vladimír Baluška
  Lars Bruggemann
  Roman Gofman
  Antonin Jeřábek
  Mikko Kaukokari
  Geoffrey Miller
  Linus Öhlund
  Konstantin Olenin
  Steve Patafie
  Pascal St-Jaques
  Marcus Vinnerborg
  Tobias Wehrli

Linesmen
  Jordan Browne
  Pierre Dehaen
  Gleb Lazarev
  Miroslav Lhotský
  Andreas Malmqvist
  Bevan Mills
  Jani Pesonen
  Nikolaj Ponomarjow
  Judson Ritter
  Simon Wust

Format
The four best ranked teams from each group of the preliminary round advance to the quarterfinals, while the last placed teams from each group played a relegation round in a best of three format to determine the relegated team.

Rosters

Preliminary round 
All times are local. (Eastern Standard Time – UTC-5)

Group A

Group B

Relegation round 

Note:  was relegated for the 2016 World Junior Ice Hockey Championships

Playoff round

Quarterfinals

Semifinals

Bronze medal game

Final

Statistics

Scoring leaders 
GP = Games played; G = Goals; A = Assists; Pts = Points; +/− = Plus-minus; PIM = Penalties in minutesSource: IIHF.com

Goaltending leaders 
(minimum 40% team's total ice time)

TOI = Time On Ice (minutes:seconds); GA = Goals against; GAA = Goals against average; Sv% = Save percentage; SO = ShutoutsSource: IIHF.com

Tournament awards
Reference: 
Most Valuable Player
 Goaltender:  Denis Godla

All-star team
 Goaltender:  Denis Godla
 Defencemen:  Gustav Forsling,  Josh Morrissey
 Forwards:  Sam Reinhart,  Max Domi,  Connor McDavid

IIHF best player awards
 Goaltender:  Denis Godla
 Defenceman:  Vladislav Gavrikov
 Forward:  Max Domi

Final standings

Note that due to the lack of playoff games for determining the spots 5–8, these spots were determined by the preliminary round records for each team.

Division I

Division I A
The Division I A tournament was played in Asiago, Italy, from 14 to 20 December 2014.

Division I B
The Division I B tournament was played in Dunaújváros, Hungary, from 14 to 20 December 2014.

Division II

Division II A
The Division II A tournament was played in Tallinn, Estonia, from 7 to 13 December 2014.

Division II B
The Division II B tournament was played in Jaca, Spain, from 13 to 19 December 2014.

Division III

The Division III tournament was played in Dunedin, New Zealand, from 20 to 25 January 2015.

On December 27, 2014 organizers announced that the Bulgarian Ice Hockey Federation withdrew their U20 team from the tournament.

References

External links
 http://www.worldjunior2015.com Official site
  Hockey Canada site

 
World Junior Ice Hockey Championships
World Junior Ice Hockey Championships
2015
2015 World Junior Ice Hockey Championships
World Junior Ice Hockey Championships
2015 World Junior Ice Hockey Championships
World Junior Ice Hockey Championships
World Junior Ice Hockey Championships, 2015
World Junior Ice Hockey Championships
World Junior Ice Hockey Championships
World Junior Ice Hockey Championships
World Junior Ice Hockey Championships
World Junior Ice Hockey Championships
Ice hockey competitions in Montreal
International sports competitions in Toronto